Edith Barrett (born Edith Barrett Williams; January 19, 1907 – February 22, 1977) was an American actress. She was a romantic star on Broadway and in the Little Theatre Movement in New England summer stock from the mid-1920s to the late 1930s. Her repertoire included plays by James M. Barrie, William Shakespeare, Noël Coward, Robert Browning, A.A. Milne, and George Bernard Shaw. Her best-known cinematic work includes I Walked with a Zombie (1943), Ruthless (1948) and Jane Eyre (1943).

Biography
Born in Roxbury, Massachusetts, Barrett was the daughter of Marshall S. P. Williams and Edith Barrett Williams and a granddaughter of 19th-century American tragedian Lawrence Barrett. She entered the entertainment industry at age 16 in a staging of Walter Hampden's production of Cyrano de Bergerac. At age 19, in 1926, she appeared with Hampden in Caponsacchi. During the 1930s, she performed as a cast member of Orson Welles's Mercury Theatre troupe.

While playing Sibil in the Mercury Theatre 1937 production of The Shoemaker's Holiday, she met leading man Vincent Price. The two married in 1938. Barrett moved to Southern California with her husband in late 1939 and gave birth to the couple's and Barrett's only child, author/poet and environmental activist Vincent Barrett (V. B.) Price, in 1940. Their marriage ended in 1948.

Barrett is often mentioned in a troika of Broadway stars of the 1930s alongside Eva Le Gallienne, Katherine Cornell, and sometimes Helen Gahagan. Her most famous roles include Pompelia, her first starring role, in Caponsacchi, which ran for five seasons, and as Sara Moonlight in the 1929 play Mrs. Moonlight by Benn Levy, with which she toured the country, performing more than 500 times. After opening night, the New York Times ran a review of her performance with the headline "A Star Is Born."

In 1934, she played Anne Brontë in the premiere of Dan Totheroh's play Moor Born about the Brontë sisters. Two years later, she was cast as Katherine O'Shea, the romantic lead in Elsie Schauffler's drama Parnell about the Irish nationalist leader Charles Stewart Parnell. Former New York Times drama critic Brooks Atkinson said of this role that Barrett gave “one of her best performances, if not the best performance, of her career.”

In total, Barrett's Broadway credits include Wuthering Heights (1939), The Shoemakers' Holiday (1938), Wise Tomorrow (1937), Parnell (1936), Symphony (1935), Piper Paid (1934), Allure (1934), Moor Born (1934), Strange Orchestra (1933), The Perfect Marriage (1932), Troilus and Cressida (1932), Mrs. Moonlight (1930), Michael and Mary (1929), Becky Sharp (1929), The Phantom Lover (1928), Caponsacchi (1926), The Immortal Thief (1926), King Henry IV, Part I (1926), The Servant in the House (1926), Cyrano de Bergerac (1926), The Merchant of Venice (1925), Hamlet (1925), and Trelawny of the "Wells" (1925).

After starring on Broadway often as the romantic heroine, her Hollywood career started as a character actress in 1941 in a film noir directed by Charles Vidor, Ladies in Retirement. She played one of the two half-witted half-sisters of Ida Lupino's homicidal character. Her best remembered movie role is possibly Mrs. Holland's mother-in-law, Mrs. Rand, in the cult classic I Walked with a Zombie (1943), a movie sometimes described as Jane Eyre in the Caribbean. She was almost three years younger than her "son" in that film (played by Tom Conway). She appeared briefly onscreen with Price twice in The Song of Bernadette (1943) and again in Keys of the Kingdom (1944). The following year she was seen as Mrs. Fairfax in 20th Century-Fox's adaptation of the real Jane Eyre (1944). She retired from films after a minor role in The Swan (1956), compiling a filmography of more than 20 films. 

In the mid-1950s, Barrett revived her career on television in a series of appearances in character roles in Alfred Hitchcock Presents. She essayed the role of Sarah Barnhart in a Telephone Time drama entitled Recipe for Success in 1958. She went on to perform in series such as Schlitz Playhouse of Stars, Westinghouse Desilu Playhouse, Lux Video Theatre, and Northwest Passage.

Barrett spent much of her later life befriending and helping other New York stage actresses who found the transition to cinemagraph technology both career-crippling and creatively demoralizing. She often said of her own faltering film and television career that “the screen just didn't like me,” implying that she was not photogenic.

Barrett died at age 70 in Albuquerque, New Mexico, living near her son, V. B. Price, and his family. She had made it something of a habit and a joke to fib about her age when it suited her. She was so successful at it that the headline of the New York Times obituary declared she had died at age 64.

Filmography

Notes

External links

 
 
 
 

1907 births
1977 deaths
20th-century American actresses
Actresses from Boston
American film actresses
American stage actresses
20th-century American singers